David Leonard is an American record producer and audio engineer.

Production discography
 1981: Chaka Khan – What Cha' Gonna Do for Me – co-engineer
 1981: The Go-Go's – Beauty and the Beat – mixing assistant
 1982: Toto – Toto IV – co-engineer
 1983: The Go-Go's – Vacation – studio assistant
 1985: Fishbone – Fishbone – co-engineer, mixer
 1986: Fishbone – In Your Face – co-mixer
 1986: Eddie Money – Can't Hold Back – co-engineer
 1986: Various Artists – Quicksilver – engineer
 1987: Sheena Easton – No Sound But a Heart – co-producer
 1988: Michelle Shocked – Short Sharp Shocked – mixer
 1988: Parthenon Huxley - Sunny Nights - mixer
 1989: Belinda Carlisle – Runaway Horses – co-engineer
 1989: The Outfield – Voices of Babylon – co-producer
 1991: Susanna Hoffs – When You're a Boy – co-engineer, co-mixer
 1992: The Men – The Men – producer and engineer
 1992: Soul Asylum – Grave Dancers Union – co-mixer
 1992: Sophie B. Hawkins – Tongues and Tails – co-mixer
 1992: The Neville Brothers – Family Groove – producer, mixer, recorder
 1993: Dwight Yoakam-This Time-mix engineer
 1993: John Mellencamp – Human Wheels – co-producer
 1994: Alison Moyet – Essex – co-mixer
 1995: October Project – Falling Farther In – engineer
 1997: Indigo Girls – Shaming of the Sun – co-producer
 1998: Ace of Base – Cruel Summer – co-mixer
 1998: Barenaked Ladies – Stunt – co-producer, co-engineer, co-mixer
 1999: Moist – Mercedes 5 and Dime – producer
 2000: Earthsuit – Kaleidoscope Superior – producer
 2000: Hootie and the Blowfish – Scattered, Smothered and Covered – co-mixer
 2000: Geddy Lee – My Favourite Headache – co-producer
 2000: Tara MacLean – Live from Austin – producer, mixer
 2001: Paul McCartney – Driving Rain – co-mixer
 2001: Rustic Overtones – ¡Viva Nueva! – co-producer, co-engineer, co-mixer
 2004: Juliana Hatfield – In Exile Deo – co-producer
 2004: k.d. lang – Hymns of the 49th Parallel – engineer, mixer
 2004: Rush – Feedback – producer
 2005: Audio Adrenaline – Until My Heart Caves In – producer
 2006: Shaye – Lake of Fire – co-mixer
 2008: k.d. lang – Watershed – co-engineer, mixer
 2010: David Leonard - The Quickening - songwriter, artist

Awards
 1983 – Co-engineer of Best Engineered Album, Non-Classical – for Toto IV.
 2006 – Producer of Best Rock Gospel Album – for Until My Heart Caves In.

References

External links

American record producers
American audio engineers
Grammy Award winners
Living people
Place of birth missing (living people)
Year of birth missing (living people)